The 2017 Uzbek League was the 26th season of top-level football in Uzbekistan since 1992. Lokomotiv Tashkent were the defending champions from the 2016 campaign.

Teams

Navbahor Namangan remained for the 2017 Uzbek League after winning in the relegation play-off match with Naryn. Obod Tashkent was promoted to the 2016 League as the 2015 First League winner. The draw for the 2016 season was held on 20 December 2016. The first matchday is scheduled for 3 March 2017.

Managerial changes

Foreign players

The number of foreign players is restricted to five per USL team. A team can use only five foreign players on the field in each game.

League table

Season statistics

Top scorers

Source: Soccerway

References

Uzbekistan Super League seasons